Reginald Cropper (21 January 1902 – 1942) was an English professional footballer who played in the Football League for Crystal Palace, Mansfield Town, Norwich City and Tranmere Rovers.

References

1902 births
1942 deaths
English footballers
Association football forwards
English Football League players
Watford F.C. players
Notts County F.C. players
Norwich City F.C. players
Guildford City F.C. players
Tranmere Rovers F.C. players
Crystal Palace F.C. players
Mansfield Town F.C. players